The 1959 Campeon de Campeones was the 18th Mexican Super Cup football one-leg match played on May, 1959.

 League winners: Guadalajara
 Cup winners: Zacatepec

Match details

References
- Statistics of Mexican Super Cup. (RSSSF)

Campeón de Campeones
Campeón
May 1959 sports events in Mexico